The University of Missouri School of Accountancy is one of 19 schools and colleges at the University of Missouri. The school, part of the Trulaske College of Business, awards Bachelors, Masters, and PhD level degrees. Both the undergraduate and graduate programs are ranked in the top twenty nationwide. Along with the rest of the college of business, it is located in Cornell Hall.

References

External links

School of Accountancy
Missouri
Educational institutions established in 1975
University subdivisions in Missouri